Hülgelaid is an island belonging to the country of Estonia. 

Latitude: 58°13'22.44"
Longitude: 22°31'1.56"

Hülgelaid has a length of 1.23 kilometres.

See also
List of islands of Estonia

References

Islands of Estonia
Kuressaare